Media Group Ukraine was a media holding company that manages System Capital Management Group's television and new media projects. The holding company is a professional investor in Ukrainian media business. Media Group Ukraine was one of the largest media holding companies in Ukraine.

In July 2022, it was announced that Rinat Akhmetov (sole owner of the media group) had left the media business. It was announced that Media Group Ukraine plans to give up all broadcast and satellite television licenses and print media licenses in Ukraine in favor of the state, as well as the termination of online media. This was explained by the entry into force of the law on oligarchs. However, Forbes Ukraine made a report in which stated, that the Media Group Ukraine costed 100-150 mln USD per year, thus it was not profitable business and Akhmetov decided to cut costs during the ongoing war with Russia. On 21 July 2022 the National Council of Ukraine for Television and Radio canceled the licenses of  the eight TV channels of Media Group Ukraine.

Subcidiaries 
The company was established in 2010 and currently includes:

 Ukrayina, a national FTA TV channel
 entertaining youth TV channel NLO-TV
 News channel Україна 24
 thematic TV channels Football 1, Football 2, Football 3
 regional TV channel Channel 34
 Digital Screens (video-on-demand platform OLL.TV)
 Tele Pro (a production company)
 Mediapartnerstvo Media Agency
 Segodnya Multimedia
Media Group Ukraine' channels its principal investments into development and promotion of existing business areas and technologies and into new, prospective projects.

References

External links

Television networks in Ukraine
Mass media in Donetsk
Mass media in Kyiv
2022 disestablishments in Ukraine
Mass media disestablished in 2022